EMCO MSI Package Builder is a software tool that creates Windows Installer (MSI) packages. The tool allows creating new MSI packages and converting non-silent EXE setups to silent MSI packages for unattended remote installation.

Functionality
EMCO MSI Package Builder generates silent MSI packages that have a single installation workflow and preconfigured installation options. The generated MSI packages can be installed to Windows PCs over a network in an unattended mode using software distribution tools that support MSI deployment. The main feature of the application is converting non-silent EXE setups to silent MSI packages, which can be used by network administrators to prepare software installation packages for unattended deployment.

Key features and functions
 Creating x86 and x64 silent MSI packages
 Converting non-silent EXE setups to silent MSI packages
 Wrapping silent installations into MSI packages
 Capturing changes in the file system, registry, Windows services and environment variables to create installation projects
 Managing installation resources through GUI
 Compatibility with Windows XP, Windows Server 2003, Windows Vista, Windows Server 2008, Windows 7, Windows Server 2012 and Windows 8

Converting non-silent EXE setups to silent MSI packages
With EMCO MSI Package Builder, the EXE to MSI conversion process is based on capturing changes performed by an EXE installation. EMCO MSI Package Builder captures file system and registry changes to create an installation project and generate an MSI package that would apply those changes. Changes capturing is performed in runtime by a kernel-mode driver that can associate changes with the system processes that initiated them, so the created installation projects include the captured changes grouped by processes, which simplifies filtering-out of unwanted changes initiated by background system processes.

Functionality limitations
EMCO MSI Package Builder is primarily used by network administrators who need to create preconfigured silent installations ready for automatic remote deployment. Hence, it has a limited set of features for creating fully functional MSI packages designed for interactive installation. The limitations include the following:
 Only silent MSI packages can be created. There is no option to add an installation GUI wizard.
 The created MSI packages can include file system and registry changes, manage Windows shortcuts, services and environment variables, and execute custom actions before and/or after installations. There is no access to editing low-level MSI tables.
 Non-silent Windows system software installations, including driver installations, OS patches and Windows system tools, cannot be converted into MSI packages. This technological limitation is common for all types of installation repackaging solutions.

See also
 Windows Installer
 List of installation software
 WiX

References

External links
 

Installation software
Utilities for Windows